Des James is a former Australian rules footballer who played for Sandy Bay in the Tasmanian Football League (TFL). 

James, a back pocket, is noted his performances at the 1979 Perth State of Origin Carnival, which earned him a spot in the All-Australian team. 

An Indigenous player, he was inducted into the Tasmanian Football Hall of Fame in 2005.

References

External links
State of Origin carnival

Australian rules footballers from Tasmania
Tasmanian State of Origin players
Sandy Bay Football Club players
Indigenous Australian players of Australian rules football
All-Australians (1953–1988)
Tasmanian Football Hall of Fame inductees
Year of birth missing (living people)
Living people